(lit. "Cultural Properties Monthly") is a monthly magazine of research on the Cultural Properties of Japan. It is published in Japanese by the Agency for Cultural Affairs.

See also
 National Treasures of Japan
 Hozon Kagaku

References

External links
 

1963 establishments in Japan
Architecture in Japan
Cultural magazines
Japanese art
Japanese studies
Magazines established in 1963
Magazines published in Tokyo
Monthly magazines published in Japan